The 1980 Oregon Ducks football team represented the University of Oregon in the 1980 NCAA Division I-A football season. Playing as a member of the Pacific-10 Conference (Pac-10), the team was led by head coach Rich Brooks, in his fourth year, and played their home games at Autzen Stadium in Eugene, Oregon. They finished the season with a record of six wins, three losses and two ties  overall,  in 

In their rivalry game with Washington, the Ducks won in Seattle for the first time in twelve years; the win also broke a six-game losing streak to the Huskies. Oregon defeated all three northwest teams in the Pac-10, their first sweep in 26 years.

After the season in December, Brooks' contract was extended through the 1984 season with a salary increase, from under $37,000 to over $46,000.

Schedule

Roster

NFL Draft
Two Ducks were selected in the 1981 NFL Draft, which lasted twelve rounds (332 selections).

List of Oregon Ducks in the NFL draft

References

Oregon
Oregon Ducks football seasons
Oregon Ducks football